Hoseynabad-e Mazafari (also Romanized as Ḩoseynābād-e Maẓafarī; also known as Hosein Abad Kahnooj and Ḩoseynābād) is a village in Ganjabad Rural District, Esmaili District, Anbarabad County, Kerman Province, Iran. At the 2006 census, its population was 18, in 4 families.

References 

Populated places in Anbarabad County